Godah, also called Hundung, is a village located south of Ukhrul in the Ukhrul district, Manipur State, India. The village falls under the Phungyar subdivision. The village is approximately 70 kilometers from Ukhrul and is partially connected by Ukhrul-Phungyar State highway. Godah is bordered by Hangkau in the east, Shingkap in the west, Alang in the south and Shangshak in the north.

Population 
According to 2011 census, Godah has 76 households with a 336 people. 158 are male and 178 are female. Of the total population, 56 were in the age group of 0–6 years. The average sex ratio of the village is 1127 female to 1000 male, which is higher than the state average of 985. The literacy rate of the village is 82.14%, which is higher than the state average of 76.94%. The male literacy rate is 88.28%, while female literacy rate was 76.97%.

People and Occupations
The village is home to people of Tangkhul Naga tribe. The majority of the inhabitants are Christians. Most of the inhabitants are employed in agriculture.

References

Villages in Ukhrul district